Sarah Potts may refer to:
 Sarah Potts (Shortland Street), a character on Shortland Street
 Sarah-Jane Potts (born 1976), English actor
 Sarah Potts (curler) (born 1989), Canadian curler

See also
Potts (disambiguation)